Johann Georg Abicht (21 March 1672 – 5 June 1740) was a German Lutheran theologian, born at Königsee, Schwarzburg-Sondershausen.

After finishing his studies at the universities of Jena and Leipzig, Abicht became teacher of oriental languages at the latter in 1702. In 1707 he was appointed rector of the college of Danzig and pastor at the Holy Trinity Church. In 1729 he was appointed general superintendent, professor of theology and pastor at the town church of Wittenberg.

His best-known works are those about oriental languages and Hebrew archaeology.

Publications
 Methodus linguae sanctae, Leipzig, 1718
 Dissertatio de Libro recti, Leipzig 1732 - a Latin translation of the Hebrew midrash "Book of Jasher" (Venice 1625)

Sources

 Allgemeine Deutsche Biographie - online version at Wikisource

1672 births
1740 deaths
People from Königsee
German Lutheran theologians
Members of the Prussian Academy of Sciences
People from Schwarzburg-Sondershausen
University of Jena alumni
Leipzig University alumni
German Hebraists
18th-century German Protestant theologians
German male non-fiction writers
18th-century German male writers